Football Club Lanaudière was a Canadian semi-professional soccer club based in Lanaudière-Nord, Quebec that plays in the Première Ligue de soccer du Québec. The club was founded in 2016 by the Association Régionale de Soccer (ARS) Lanaudière to replace FC L'Assomption-Lanaudière after the latter's departure from the PLSQ. The club was supported by the region's 14 affiliated amateur soccer clubs, and is the first club in the PLSQ to use this regional model.

History
The club was formed in 2016 by the Association Régionale de Soccer (ARS) Lanaudière to replace FC L'Assomption-Lanaudière, one of its member clubs, which was leaving the league, to ensure that the region still had a presence in the Première Ligue de soccer du Québec. For their inaugural season, about 40% of the players were from Lanaudière, with the team aiming to have 80% of the roster come from the region within five years. Andrew Olivieri was the club's original head coach. In 2018, the club finished in last place in the league standings, but managed to win the League Cup, defeating FC Gatineau in the final in penalty kicks.

In 2021, it was announced that the club would transfer its license to CS Lanaudière-Nord (a club formed from the merger of previous license holder FC L'Assomption-Lanaudière and AS Laser).

Seasons

Notable former players
The following players have either played at the professional or international level, either before or after playing for the PLSQ team:

Coaching history

 Andrew Olivieri (2016-17)
 Mike Vitulano (2017-18)
 Giuseppe Cortese (2018-19)
 Kevin Mendes Duarte (2020-2021)
 Marco Antonio Torrens (2021)

Honours
Coupe PLSQ (1): 2018

See also
 FC L'Assomption-Lanaudière

Notes

References

Association football clubs established in 2016
Lanaudiere
Soccer clubs in Quebec
2016 establishments in Quebec